Mauritius v. United Kingdom was an arbitration case concerning the status of the Chagos Archipelago and the attempts of the United Kingdom government to create a Marine Protected Area in British Indian Ocean Territory. The dispute was arbitrated by a arbitral tribunal constituted under Annex VII of the 1982 United Nations Convention on Law of the Sea. The Permanent Court of Arbitration was asked on the 31st of March 2011 to function as registry in the proceedings.

Disputes over arbiters
In 2011 the government of Mauritius challenged Sir Christopher Greenwood's role in the arbitration proceedings on the grounds that his role as a UK Foreign and Commonwealth legal adviser could bias him in favour of the United Kingdom's claims to the Chagos Islands. However, this was rejected by the tribunal on the basis that this "neither constituted nor continued an already existing relationship."

Dispute over jurisdiction
On the 15 January 2013 the tribunal released procedural order no. 2. In this order the tribunal rejected a British request that the tribunal should deal with British jurisdictional challenges in a preliminary phase.

Award of the arbitral tribunal 
On the 18 March 2015, the arbitral tribunal ruled that the Chagos Marine Protected Area was "not in accordance with the provisions of the Convention" and declared unanimously that in establishing the MPA surrounding the Chagos Archipelago the United Kingdom had breached its obligations under Articles 2(3), 56(2), and 194(4) of the Convention.

See also
United Nations Convention on the Law of the Sea

References

External links
 Chagos Marine Protected Area Arbitration (Mauritius v. United Kingdom)
Legal consequences of the separation of the Chagos Archipelago from Mauritius in 1965 (Request for Advisory Opinion): a related case at the International Court of Justice

2013 in Mauritius
2013 in the United Kingdom
Chagos Archipelago sovereignty dispute
Law of the sea
Mauritius–United Kingdom relations
Permanent Court of Arbitration cases
Environmental controversies